Alma Depot is a historic site in Alma, Georgia. It is a one-story frame building and was constructed in 1906 in a style similar to many of the era.  It is located on Dixon Street and 11th Street.  Alma was the first stop of a logging railroad which had been constructed in 1887.  When a turpentine company was started about 1899, Alma got its name and a post office. The town was incorporated in 1904.  Alma became the county seat of Bacon County when the county was created in 1914.  For the first few decades of the town's existence, Alma saw growth along the railroad and around the depot.

At its peak from 1906 until the 1920s, as many as six passenger trains per day stopped at the depot.  Passenger service stopped in 1952 and freight service stopped later.

It was added to the National Register of Historic Places in 1983.

See also
National Register of Historic Places listings in Bacon County, Georgia
Brunswick and Birmingham Railroad

References

Railway stations in the United States opened in 1906
Buildings and structures in Bacon County, Georgia
Railway stations on the National Register of Historic Places in Georgia (U.S. state)
Atlantic Coast Line Railroad stations
Railway stations closed in 1952
Former railway stations in Georgia (U.S. state)